This is a list of books relating to The Simpsons television series.

Official books

The Simpsons Library of Wisdom

Episode guides
The Simpsons episode guides

Vault of Simpsonology

Annuals
 The Simpsons Annual 1992 in Mind-Bending, Knee-Slapping, Eye-Popping 3D
 The Simpsons Annual 2010
 The Simpsons Annual 2011
 The Simpsons Annual 2012
 The Simpsons Annual 2013
 The Simpsons Annual 2014
 Bart Simpson Annual 2011
 Bart Simpson Annual 2012
 Bart Simpson Annual 2013
 Bart Simpson Annual 2014

See also
 List of The Simpsons comics
 Bibliography of works on The Simpsons
 Simpsons Illustrated magazine

Sources
 

Lists of books
Books
Books